Restall is a surname. Notable people with the surname include:

 Matthew Restall (born 1964), historian of Colonial Latin America
 Emma Restall Orr (born 1965), British neo-druid, animist, priest, poet, and author
 Greg Restall (born 1969), Australian philosopher
 Robin L. Restall, american ornithologist